Stockton, California, held an election for mayor on June 3, 2008, and November 4, 2008. It saw the election of Ann Johnston.

Results

First round

Runoff

References 

Stockton
Mayoral elections in Stockton, California
Stockton, California